Himesh Jitendra Patel (born 13 October 1990) is a British actor, musician, and singer. He is known for portraying Tamwar Masood on the BBC soap opera EastEnders from 2007 to 2016, for starring in the 2019 musical romantic comedy film Yesterday, and for the 2020 science fiction action film Tenet with John David Washington. In 2020, he had a recurring role in the HBO comedy series Avenue 5. In 2021, he starred in the HBO miniseries Station Eleven earning a nomination for Primetime Emmy Award for Outstanding Lead Actor in a Limited Series or Movie. That same year, he also starred in Adam McKay's Netflix satirical comedy film Don't Look Up, earning a Screen Actors Guild Award for Outstanding Cast in a Motion Picture nomination.

Early life
Patel was born on 13 October 1990 in Sawtry, Cambridgeshire.  His parents are both Indian Gujaratis. His mother was born in Zambia and his father was born in Kenya. He grew up speaking Gujarati.

Patel attended Prince William School in Oundle, Northamptonshire. As a child, he began impersonating his favourite characters on television and film. When he was 11, he was cast in a school play, This Is Your Life, Santa Claus, as Michael Aspel. Upon the suggestion by a teacher, his parents then signed him up for a local theatre group, the Key Youth Theatre in Peterborough. Later, he became a member of The Young Actors' Company in Cambridge, where he also took film classes. He took piano lessons and bought himself an electric guitar and taught himself to play at the age of 13.

His parents ran a newsagent's shop in Cambridgeshire. Patel ran a paper route until he was 21.

Career

EastEnders 
When he was 16, Patel received a call on the day of his GCSEs saying he had landed an audition for the British soap opera EastEnders through an agency in The Young Actors' Company. He finished his last exam and had his parents rush him to his audition. After his first audition a casting assistant saw him waiting outside the audition room and asked him to read for the casting director. Patel won the part of Tamwar Masood, and 1 October 2007 marked his first appearance on EastEnders. 
In 2011 Patel and Meryl Fernandes won the Inside Soap Award for Best Wedding.

Patel has also appeared in EastEnders: E20 as Tamwar. In 2011 he co-wrote episode one of series three with co-star Charlie G. Hawkins. In 2013 he filmed an internet spin-off of EastEnders called Tamwar Tales - The Life of an Assistant Market Inspector. Four episodes were aired weekly, starting on 25 July 2013. All four episodes and one behind-the-scenes clip are available on the EastEnders official website.

He played Tamwar for nine years until he left the show in 2016 to explore other opportunities. His last appearance was on 22 April 2016.

Short films 
He has appeared in a number of short films. In 2014, he was cast as Pavan in the short film Two Dosas; the film won several awards, including Best Short Comedy at the London Short Film Festival and Best Comedy at the Aspen Film Festival.  At the Shuffle festival, it won a third award, judged by Danny Boyle, who would later direct Patel in Yesterday (2019). 

Patel portrayed The Suit in The Fox (2017), another comedy short by Henry Scriven.

He is working on a short film titled Is This Life? (2019).

In 2021, he acted in the short film Enjoy.

After EastEnders 
On 27 September 2016 he made his first appearance on TV since leaving EastEnders in the first episode of the Channel 4 sitcom Damned. He played ex-constable and social worker Nitin for 12 episodes in two six-episode series. He appeared in Rapscallions (2016), a short film by Henry Scriven.

In 2017 he was cast in Don Juan in Soho as "Vagabond" with David Tennant playing the titular character. Patel played Amit in an episode of the BBC comedy Climaxed  in the same year. He made a short appearance as Mr. Glencuddy in the second episode of the comedy Motherland.

Patel has been credited as a voice actor in two Doctor Who audio stories. He voiced Biotech Dendry in Day of the Vashta Nerada as well as Engineer and Ayrton Valencia in The Lifeboat and the Deathboat.

He is credited as a producer for the 2017 feature film My Pure Land. In 2019, he made his film debut with his breakthrough role as Jack Malik in Yesterday (2019). He sings live throughout the film, covering various songs by The Beatles.

He appeared in The Aeronauts (2019) alongside Felicity Jones and Eddie Redmayne.

Patel was cast as Emery Staines in The Luminaries, a mini-series based on the 2013 book by Eleanor Catton. The plot of the TV series differs from the book. Patel appears on the 2019 Children in Need album. He sang the Killers' song, "All These Things That I've Done". According to an interview, Patel is working on his first original TV script with What Larks Productions.

In 2019, Patel joined the cast of HBO Max limited series Station Eleven. In 2020, Patel appeared as Jordan Hatwal in the comedy series Avenue 5, starring Hugh Laurie.

In 2020, Patel appeared in the film Tenet as Mahir, a fixer who initially helps Neil and the protagonist in their plot to steal the painting from the Oslo airport. Patel appears in the 2021 Netflix film Don't Look Up, portraying Phillip Kaj, the unscrupulous journalist dating the astronomer, Jennifer Lawrence's Kate Dibiasky, who is responsible for detecting the movie's comet. For his performance and along with the ensemble he received the Screen Actors Guild Award for Outstanding Performance by a Cast in a Motion Picture nomination.

In 2022, Patel made an end credits cameo in Enola Holmes 2 as Dr. John Watson.

Personal life
Patel is a supporter of Tottenham Hotspur F.C. He became a father in December 2020 to a baby daughter.

Filmography

Film

Television

Stage

Short films

Awards and nominations

Discography

Soundtrack albums

Other charted songs

References

External links
 

1990 births
Living people
21st-century English male actors
British male actors of Indian descent
English male film actors
English male soap opera actors
English people of Indian descent
English people of Kenyan descent
English people of Zambian descent
English people of Gujarati descent
English rock singers
Male actors from Cambridgeshire
National Youth Theatre members